Millennium IT Towers is an information technology (IT) park situated in the city of Visakhapatnam, India. It was set up for the growth of information technology and as an initiative in making Visakhapatnam city as a Financial-tech (Fintech) Capital in the state of Andhra Pradesh by the APIIC and Government of Andhra Pradesh. Millennium IT Tower 1 was inaugurated by then Chief Minister of Andhra Pradesh N. Chandrababu Naidu on 15 February 2019

Infrastructure

See also 

 Fintech Valley Vizag

References

Buildings and structures in Visakhapatnam
Economy of Andhra Pradesh
Economy of Visakhapatnam
Science parks in India
High-technology business districts in India
Industrial parks in India